St. Thomas Tommies may refer to:

 St. Thomas (Minnesota) Tommies, the athletic team of the University of St. Thomas, St. Paul–Minneapolis, Minnesota, US
 St. Thomas (Canada) Tommies, the athletic teams of St. Thomas University, Fredericton, New Brunswick